Early growth response proteins are a family of zinc finger transcription factors.

Members of the family include:
 EGR1, EGR2, EGR3 and EGR4

References

External links 
 

Transcription factors
Zinc proteins
Protein families